The men's welterweight event was part of the boxing programme at the 1932 Summer Olympics. The weight class was the fourth-heaviest contested, and allowed boxers of up to 147 pounds (66.7 kilograms). The competition was held from Tuesday, August 9, 1932 to Saturday, August 13, 1932. Sixteen boxers from 16 nations competed.

Medalists

Results

References

External links
Official Olympic Report
 

Welterweight